The B & O Railroad Potomac River Crossing is a  historic site where a set of railroad bridges, originally built by the Baltimore and Ohio Railroad, span the Potomac River between Sandy Hook, Maryland and Harpers Ferry, West Virginia. The site was added to the National Register of Historic Places on February 14, 1978 for its significance in commerce, engineering, industry, invention, and transportation.

History

The original Harper's Ferry operated from 1733 until it was replaced by a timber covered road bridge in about 1824 at the confluence of the Potomac and Shenandoah Rivers.

Built in 1836–1837, the B&O's first crossing over the Potomac was an  covered wood truss. It was the only rail crossing of the Potomac River until after the Civil War. The single-track bridge, which comprised six river spans plus a span over the Chesapeake and Ohio Canal, was designed by Benjamin Henry Latrobe, II. In 1837 the Winchester and Potomac Railroad reached Harpers Ferry from the south, and Latrobe joined it to the B&O line using a "Y" span.

John Brown used the B&O bridge at the beginning of his failed attempt to start a slave insurrection in Virginia and further south.

The bridge was destroyed during the American Civil War and replaced temporarily with a pontoon bridge.

The two crossings today, which are on different alignments, are from the late 19th century and early 20th century. A steel Pratt truss and plate girder bridge was built in 1894 to carry the B&O Valley line (now the CSX Shenandoah Subdivision) toward Winchester, Virginia, along the Shenandoah River. This was complemented in 1930–1931 with a deck plate girder bridge that carries the Baltimore and Ohio Railroad (B&O) main line to Martinsburg, West Virginia (the line is now the CSX Cumberland Subdivision).

A rail tunnel, known as the Harpers Ferry Tunnel, was built at the same time as the 1894 bridge to carry the line through the Maryland Heights, eliminating a sharp curve. In the 1930s the western end of the tunnel was widened during the construction of the second bridge to allow the broadest possible curve across the river.

Accident 
On December 21, 2019, a CSX freight train derailed on the bridge, sending several cars into the river. There were no injuries and the bridge was later reopened.

Gallery

See also
Harpers Ferry National Historical Park
Harpers Ferry Historic District
John Brown's Raid on Harpers Ferry
List of bridges documented by the Historic American Engineering Record in Maryland
List of bridges documented by the Historic American Engineering Record in West Virginia
List of bridges on the National Register of Historic Places in Maryland
List of bridges on the National Register of Historic Places in West Virginia

References

External links

, including photo in 1978, at Maryland Historical Trust

American Civil War sites in West Virginia
Baltimore and Ohio Railroad bridges
Bridges completed in 1851
Railroad bridges on the National Register of Historic Places in Maryland
Railroad bridges on the National Register of Historic Places in West Virginia
Buildings and structures in Jefferson County, West Virginia
Buildings and structures in Washington County, Maryland
Bridges over the Potomac River
Harpers Ferry, West Virginia
Historic American Engineering Record in Maryland
Historic American Engineering Record in West Virginia
Jefferson County, West Virginia in the American Civil War
National Register of Historic Places in Jefferson County, West Virginia
Railroad bridges in Maryland
Railroad bridges in West Virginia
Transportation in Jefferson County, West Virginia
Transportation in Washington County, Maryland
Tourist attractions in Jefferson County, West Virginia
1851 establishments in Maryland
Steel bridges in the United States
Plate girder bridges in the United States
Pratt truss bridges in the United States
1851 establishments in Virginia
Interstate railroad bridges in the United States
Buildings and structures in Harpers Ferry, West Virginia